Stine Fischer Christensen (born 1985) is a Danish actress. She has appeared in more than fifteen films since 1997. For her performance as Anna Louisa Hansson in After the Wedding she won the Bodil and Robert Award for Best Actress in a Supporting Role.

Selected filmography

Awards
 Bodil Award for Best Actress in a Supporting Role (2006)
 Robert Award for Best Actress in a Supporting Role (2007)

References

External links 

1985 births
Living people
Danish film actresses
Danish child actresses
Best Supporting Actress Bodil Award winners